Hugh N. Nicol (January 1, 1858 – June 27, 1921) was a Scottish born professional baseball player. An outfielder, Nicol played in Major League Baseball for the Chicago White Stockings, St. Louis Browns, Cincinnati Red Stockings, and Cincinnati Reds. Nicol's debut game took place on May 3, 1881. His final game took place on August 2, 1890.

Nicol had 138 stolen bases in 1887, however prior to 1898 a stolen base was credited to a baserunner who reached an extra base on a hit from another player. He had 103 stolen bases in 1888. Despite the fact that he had two 100 stolen-base seasons, only 383 of his total career stolen bases are known.  He also managed the Browns in 1897.

Nicol became the head baseball coach and athletic director at Purdue University for the Purdue Boilermakers. He also scouted for the Reds during the summers, beginning in 1911. Nicol resigned from Purdue in 1914, after accusations that the American football team played like "rowdies." He died in Lafayette, Indiana on June 27, 1921.

See also
List of Major League Baseball career stolen bases leaders
List of Major League Baseball annual stolen base leaders
List of Major League Baseball stolen base records

References

External links

1858 births
1921 deaths
19th-century baseball players
Chicago White Stockings players
St. Louis Browns (AA) players
Cincinnati Red Stockings (AA) players
Cincinnati Reds scouts
Major League Baseball right fielders
Major League Baseball players from the United Kingdom
Major League Baseball players from Scotland
Scottish baseball players
Sportspeople from East Dunbartonshire
Minor league baseball managers
Rockford White Stockings players
Kansas City Blues (baseball) players
Rockford Hustlers players
St. Joseph Saints players
Rockford Forest City players
Rockford Reds players
Rockford Red Sox players
Purdue Boilermakers athletic directors
Purdue Boilermakers baseball coaches
Scottish emigrants to the United States